Pach Kenar (also Romanized as Pāch Kenār; also known as Pācheh Kenār) is a village in Howmeh Rural District, in the Central District of Rasht County, Gilan Province, Iran. At the 2006 census, its population was 1,638, in 456 families.

References 

Populated places in Rasht County